Ferdinand Joseph Arnodin  (9 October 1845 – 24 April 1924) was a French engineer and industrialist born in Sainte-Foy-lès-Lyon, Rhône who died in Châteauneuf-sur-Loire in Loiret. Specialising in cableway transporters, he is regarded as the inventor of the transporter bridge, having been the first to patent the idea in 1887. However, the first such bridge was in fact designed by Alberto Palacio, with Arnodin's help.

Nine of the eighteen known examples of the transporter bridge may be attributed to him. Three of them still exist. They use the technology of both suspension bridges and cable-stayed bridges. Arnodin built a great number of second generation suspension bridges at the turn of the 20th century, and he also restored and consolidated a number of old first generation suspension bridges (before 1860): the aprons were reinforced and the old wire cables replaced by spirally-wound double torsion steel wire ropes, often with addition of a cable-stayed bridge (known structural modification under the name of “Système Arnodin”). His factory (for the production of prefabricated metal sub-structures) was established in Châteauneuf-sur-Loire. Vestiges of this factory were still visible a few years ago, and the chimney could still be seen, half ruined, between the Loire and railway.

The Loire Fleet Museum, at Châteauneuf-sur-Loire, shows memories of these workshops: an old model of the Nantes transporter bridge, a section of steel wire rope manufactured by Arnodin and photographs.

Major works

Bilbao Puente Colgante, 1893, still in use
Bizerta/Brest Transporter Bridge, 1898
Rouen Transporter Bridge, 1898
Rochefort-Martrou Transporter Bridge, 1900, still in use
Nantes Transporter Bridge, 1903
Marseille Transporter Bridge, 1905, destroyed 1944
Newport Transporter Bridge, 1906, still in use
Bordeaux Transporter Bridge, never finished
Sidi M'Cid Bridge, Constantine, Algeria, 1908, 160 m span

References

External links
 Newport Transporter Bridge — an historical perspective
 
 Rochefort Transporter Bridge

1845 births
1924 deaths
People from Sainte-Foy-lès-Lyon
French bridge engineers
French civil engineers
Transporter bridges